Weightlifting is one of the sports at the quadrennial Commonwealth Games competition. It has been a Commonwealth Games sport since 1950. It is a core sport and must be included in the sporting programme of each edition of the Games.

A total of 17 events were contested at the 2010 Commonwealth Games in Delhi, 8 for men 7 for women and two powerlifting events. The first women's events were introduced in 2002. Between 1990 and 2002 a medal was awarded for each of the snatch and clean and jerk phases and for the combined total, offering as many as 46 gold medals in 2002. Since 2006 medals have only been awarded based on the combined total of both of these phases, as is the case at the Olympics. From 2002 para powerlifting events were contested at the Commonwealth Games and the sports results counted under weightlifting in its first four iterations upto 2014 and from 2018, it was separated from Weightlifting sports category and is considered as a separate individual para-sport.

Editions

All-time medal table

*Note : From 2002 to 2014, Para Powerlifting Medals were awarded under Weightlifting and are included in the medal table. From 2018, It is counted under a separate sport category. See Para powerlifting at the Commonwealth Games

Updated after the 2022 Commonwealth Games

Games records

Men

Women

Historical records

Men (1998–2018)

Women (1998–2018)

References

External links
 Commonwealth Games sport index 

 
Sports at the Commonwealth Games
Commonwealth Games